Saline Water Conversion Corporation (SWCC) is a government corporation that operates desalination plants and power stations in Saudi Arabia. It is the second largest electrical provider in the country. It is the largest desalinating sea water corporation in the world, responsible for 20% of worldwide desalinated water production. SWCC workforce is 10,000+ employees and its assets value is 20+ B $.

References

Government-owned companies of Saudi Arabia
Water supply and sanitation in Saudi Arabia
Electric power companies of Saudi Arabia
Water desalination